The 2014 Open Féminin de Marseille is a professional tennis tournament played on outdoor clay courts. It is the seventeenth edition of the tournament and part of the 2014 ITF Women's Circuit, offering a total of $100,000 in prize money. It takes place in Marseille, France, on 2–8 June 2014.

Singles main draw entrants

Seeds 

 1 Rankings as of 26 May 2014

Other entrants 
The following players received wildcards into the singles main draw:
  Manon Arcangioli
  Irina Ramialison
  Caroline Roméo
  Laura Thorpe

The following players received entry from the qualifying draw:
  Jarmila Gajdošová
  Beatriz García Vidagany
  Lara Michel
  Olga Savchuk

The following player received entry by a protected ranking:
  Evgeniya Rodina

Champions

Singles 

  Alexandra Dulgheru def.  Johanna Larsson 6–3, 7–5

Doubles 

  Lourdes Domínguez Lino /  Beatriz García Vidagany def.  Yuliya Beygelzimer /  Olga Savchuk 6–1, 6–2

External links 
 2014 Open Féminin de Marseille at ITFtennis.com
  

2014 ITF Women's Circuit
2014
2014 in French tennis